Alla Grigorievna Bondar (1921-1981) was a Soviet-Ukrainian Politician (Communist).

She served as Minister of Education and Science 1962–1967.

References

1921 births
1981 deaths
Burials at Baikove Cemetery
20th-century Ukrainian women politicians
Soviet women in politics
Communist Party of Ukraine politicians
Women government ministers of Ukraine